Navalpino is a municipality in Ciudad Real, Castile-La Mancha, Spain. 
According to the 2014 census, the municipality has a population of 241 inhabitants.

It is located in the Montes de Toledo area.

References

External links

Municipalities in the Province of Ciudad Real